Josef Horejs (born 13 February 1898, date of death unknown) was an Austrian footballer. He played in four matches for the Austria national football team from 1922 to 1924.

References

External links
 

1898 births
Year of death missing
Austrian footballers
Austria international footballers
Place of birth missing
Association footballers not categorized by position